Krásná is a municipality and village in Cheb District in the Karlovy Vary Region of the Czech Republic. It has about 600 inhabitants. It is the westernmost municipality of the country.

Administrative parts
The village of Kamenná is an administrative part of Krásná.

Geography
It lies a salient region call Aš Panhandle on the border with Germany.

Krásná is situated in the Fichtel Mountains.

History

The first written mention of Krásná is from 1331 as a property of counts of Neuberg. Around 1400 Krásná was bought by the Zedtwitz family. This noble house controlled the whole of the Aš region for almost 500 years.

In 1642 a small castle was built here, but in 1828 it suffered a catastrophic fire. In 1898, a municipal brewery was opened, although it is no longer in use. The castle was torn down in the 1950s.

After World War II, because of the buffer zone, several villages in the municipality (Štítary, Újezd, Elfhausen and Nové Domy) were torn down and became ghost towns.

Between 1976 and 1990, Krásná was one of the administrative parts of Aš, but in 1990 villages of Krásná and Kamenná separated and created a new municipality.

Demographics

Transport
The train station Aš-předměstí is located near the village beyond the municipal border. A bus stop is also located in the municipality.

Notable people
Albin Dötsch (1872–1922), Austro-Hungarian politician

References

External links

Villages in Cheb District